State Route 281 (SR 281) is a south-north state highway located in the northeastern part of the U.S. state of Georgia. Its route is in Madison and Franklin Counties, with a brief section straddling the Madison-Hart County line.

Route description
SR 281 begins at an intersection with US 29/SR 8 (General Daniels Avenue North) northeast of Danielsville. It heads northeast to an intersection with SR 191 (Dalton Drive). The highway crosses the Broad River, and curves into a more north-northeast routing. It passes through rural parts of Madison County and runs along the Madison-Hart County line before entering Franklin County. Almost immediately after crossing the county line, SR 281 meets its northern terminus, an intersection with SR 17 Business (Church Street) in Royston.

History

Major intersections

See also

References

281
Transportation in Madison County, Georgia
Transportation in Franklin County, Georgia